I Walked with You a Ways is the first studio album by Plains, a collaborative project between Katie Crutchfield and Jess Williamson. It was released on Anti- Records on October 14, 2022.

Track listing
"Summer Sun" – 2:32
"Problem with It" – 3:32
"Line of Sight" – 3:37
"Abilene" – 3:03
"Hurricane" – 3:34
"Bellafatima" – 3:45
"Last 2 on Earth" – 2:53
"Easy" – 2:35
"No Record of Wrongs" – 3:07
"I Walked with You a Ways" – 2:55

References

2022 albums
Anti- (record label) albums